Mayan Temples is an album by the American composer, bandleader and keyboardist Sun Ra, recorded in 1990. Released on the Black Saint label, it was Sun Ra's final studio recording as a leader.

Critical reception 

The Omaha World-Herald wrote that the album moves "through swing and be-bop band re-creations, African rhythm workouts and outer-space weirdness."

The AllMusic review by Scott Yanow stated: "One of the finest Sun Ra recordings from his final years, this effort is particularly recommended due to the many Ra keyboard solos and John Gilmore features... Overall, this is a fine all-around studio set."

Track listing
All compositions by Sun Ra except as indicated
 "Dance of the Language Barrier" - 3:58  
 "Bygone" - 5:15  
 "Disciple No. 1" - 4:57  
 "Alone Together" (Howard Dietz, Arthur Schwartz) - 7:02  
 "Prelude to Stargazers" - 5:17  
 "Mayan Temples" - 7:40  
 "I'll Never Be The Same" (Gus Kahn, Matty Malneck, Frank Signorelli) - 4:57  
 "Stardust from Tomorrow" - 3:38  
 "El Is a Sound of Joy" - 5:26  
 "Time After Time" (Sammy Cahn, Jule Styne) - 4:21  
 "Opus in Springtime" - 6:41  
 "Theme of the Stargazers" - 14:09  
 "Sunset on the Nile" - 5:42  
Recorded at Mondial Sound, Milano, Italy on July 24 & 25, 1990.

Personnel
Sun Ra - piano, synthesizer
Michael Ray, Ahmed Abdullah - trumpet, vocals
Tyrone Hill - trombone
Marshall Allen - alto saxophone, flute
Noel Scott  - alto saxophone
John Gilmore - tenor saxophone, timbales
James Jacson - bassoon, Ancient Egyptian Infinity Drum
Ronald Wilson - tenor saxophone
Carl LeBlanc - electric guitar
Jothan Callins - bass, electric bass
Clifford Barbaro, Earl "Buster" Smith - drums
Ron McBee - congas, percussion
Jorge Silva - percussion
Elson Nascimento - surdo, percussion
June Tyson - vocals

References

Sun Ra albums
1990 albums
Black Saint/Soul Note albums